Aluminium of Greece (Aloumínio tēs Elládos) is an aluminium producing company in Greece. It was founded in 1960 by a conglomerate including French aluminium producer Pechiney. Its headquarters are in Marousi, Athens. Its production plant is located at Agios Nikolaos, near Distomo in Boeotia, on the north coast of the Gulf of Corinth. The site combines proximity to the large bauxite deposits of Boeotia and Phocis and sea transportation facilities, with unobtrusive integration into the surrounding area. The annual production capacity of this industrial complex is : 800,000 tonnes of alumina and 165,000 tonnes of aluminium.

1,100 people are directly employed by the plant. Since 2005 it is member of Mytilineos Holdings. The Company has been listed on the Athens Stock Exchange since 1973. The Company also owns Delphi-Distomon mining company.

Installations
Established in an area of Greece rich in bauxite deposits, the company's plants are: a bauxite processing unit for the production of alumina and an alumina processing unit for the production of aluminum.

Capacity

The plant processes : 
1,400,000 tonnes of Greek, and
200,000 tonnes of Tropical Bauxite.

The plant produces : 
800,000 tonnes of alumina.
165,000 tonnes of aluminum.

Aluminium of Greece has around 1,100 employees.

See also
 Mytilineos Holdings

References

External links

 Official website  &  & 

Aluminium companies of Greece
Companies based in Athens
Aluminium smelters
Mining companies of Greece
Non-renewable resource companies established in 1960
Boeotia
Greek brands
Mytilineos SA
Greek companies established in 1960